The American Literary Translators Association (ALTA) is an organization in the United States dedicated to literary translation. ALTA promotes literary translation through its annual conference, which draws hundreds of translators and literary professionals from around the world; the National Translation Awards in Poetry and Prose, an annual $5,000 prize (divvied $2,500 each) for the best book-length translation into English of poetry and prose; the Lucien Stryk Asian Translation Prize, which awards $6,000 each year for the best book-length translation of an Asian work into English; the Italian Prose in Translation Award (IPTA), which awards $5,000 each year for the best book-length translation of a work of Italian prose into English; and the ALTA Travel Fellowships, which are $1,000 prizes awarded annually to 4-6 emerging translators for travel to the annual conference. Starting in 2016, in addition to the ALTA Travel Fellowships, one fellowship, the Peter K. Jansen Memorial Fellowship, is awarded to an emerging translator of color or translator from a stateless or diaspora language.

History

The American Literary Translators Association (ALTA) was co-founded by Rainer Schulte and A. Leslie Willson in 1978 at The University of Texas at Dallas. ALTA's own scholarly journal, Translation Review, was also founded in 1978 and has been published regularly ever since. The ALTA Annual Conference has convened every year since 1978 in various locations throughout North America. From 1978 until 2014, ALTA was administratively housed at the University of Texas at Dallas. From 2014 to 2018, ALTA functioned as an independent, non-profit arts organization. In 2018, ALTA affiliated with College of Humanities at the University of Arizona, with ALTA relocating to UA in January 2019.

Annual conference

The annual ALTA conference is a four-day gathering of professional literary translators, translation students and scholars, publishers of literature in translation, and others interested in the study, practice, and promotion of literary translation. Conference events include: panel presentations on a wide range of topics related to literary translation; roundtable discussions of issues relevant to literary translators, scholars, and publishers; bilingual readings of recently published translations or translations in progress (The Annual Alexis Levitin Bilingual Reading Series); and interactive workshops on translating specific texts. In addition, each conference features keynote presentations by invited speakers; readings by the ALTA Fellows; a book exhibit of recently published literature in translation; announcements of the National Translation Awards in Poetry and Prose, the Lucien Stryk Asian Translation Prize, and the Italian Prose in Translation Award; a multilingual performance of poetry recitation known as Declamación; special events such as film screenings or play stagings; and abundant opportunities for connections among translators, students, scholars, and publishers dedicated to fostering literary translation. In recent years, ALTA conference organizers have selected a conference theme to guide panel, workshop, and roundtable proposals in the direction of a broadly defined aspect of literary translation studies. Themes may address geographies, genres, literary elements, or other angles for approaching literary translation theory and practice.

Recent conferences
 September 29-October 18, 2020 (virtual conference): ALTA43: "In Between"
 November 7-November 10, 2019 in Rochester, New York: ALTA42: "Sight and Sound", featuring a keynote by Peter Cook and Kenny Lerner, Flying Words Project 
 October 31-November 3, 2018 in Bloomington, Indiana: ALTA41: Performance, Props, and Platforms, featuring a keynote by Caridad Svich 
 October 5–8, 2017 in Minneapolis, Minnesota: "Reflections/Refractions," featuring keynotes by Lydia Davis and Tim Parks
 October 6–9, 2016 in Oakland, California: "Translation & Crossings," featuring a keynote by Don Mee Choi
 October 28–31, 2015 in Tucson, Arizona: "Translation & Traffic," featuring a keynote by Jerome Rothenberg 
 November 12–15, 2014 in Milwaukee, Wisconsin: "Politics & Translation," featuring a keynote by Christopher Merrill
 October 16–19, 2013 in Bloomington, Indiana: "The Nexus of Translation," featuring keynotes by Maureen Freely, Karen Kovacik, and Cole Swensen
 October 3–6, 2012 in Rochester, New York: "The Translation of Humor, or, the Humor of Translation," featuring a keynote by David Bellos
 November 16–19, 2011 in Kansas City, Missouri: "Translating Voices: Where the Great Plains Meet the World," featuring keynotes by Paul Vangelisti and Douglas Hofstadter
 October 20–24, 2010 in Philadelphia, Pennsylvania: "Drama in Translation," featuring keynotes by Phyllis Zatlin and Lawrence Venuti

Awards

National Translation Award

The National Translation Award (NTA) in Poetry and Prose is awarded annually for the book-length translations of fiction, poetry, drama, or creative non-fiction that, in the estimation of the panel of judges, represents the most valuable contribution to the field of literary translation each in poetry and prose made during the previous year. The original work may have been written in any language, but in order to be eligible for the NTA, the translation must be into English, and the book must have been published during the preceding calendar year. The prize awarded annually to the winning translator is worth $2,500 each in Poetry and Prose. In addition to honoring individual translators for their work, the NTA celebrates the craft of literary translation and strives to increase its visibility and broaden its market. The winner is announced each year at the ALTA Annual Conference.

Recent winners
 2020 Prose: Jordan Stump for The Cheffe: A Cook's Novel by Marie NDiaye, translated from the French
 2020 Poetry: Jake Levine, Soeun Seo, and Hedgie Choi for Hysteria by Kim Yideum, translated from the Korean
 2019 Prose: Karen Emmerich for What's Left of the Night by Ersi Sotiropoulos, translated from the Greek
 2019 Poetry: Bill Johnston (translator) for Pan Tadeusz: The Last Foray in Lithuania by Adam Mickiewicz, translated from the Polish
 2018 Prose: Charlotte Mandell for Compass by Mathias Enard, translated from the French
 2018 Poetry: Katrine Øgaard Jensen for Third-Millennium Heart by Ursula Andkjær Olsen, translated from the Danish
 2017 Prose: Esther Allen for Zama by Antonio di Benedetto, translated from the Spanish 
 2017 Poetry: Daniel Borzutzky for Valdivia by Galo Ghigliotto, translated from the Spanish
 2016 Prose: Elizabeth Harris for Tristano Dies: A Life by Antonio Tabucchi, translated from the Italian
 2016 Poetry: Hilary Kaplan for Rilke Shake by Angélica Freitas, translated from the Portuguese
 2015 Prose: William M. Hutchins for New Waw, Saharan Oasis by Ibrahim Kuni, translated from the Arabic
 2015 Poetry: Pierre Joris for Breathturn into Timestead by Paul Celan, translated from the French
 2014: Eugene Ostashevsky and Matvei Yankelevich for An Invitation for Me to Think by Alexander Vvedensky, translated from the Russian
 2013: Philip Boehm for The Hunger Angel by Herta Müller, translated from the German 
 2012: Sinan Antoon for In the Presence of Absence by Mahmoud Darwish, translated from the Arabic  
 2011: Lisa Rose Bradford for Between Words: Juan Gelman's Public Letter by Juan Gelman, translated from the Spanish
 2010: Alex Zucker for All This Belongs to Me by Petra Hůlová, translated from the Czech

For a more complete list of past winners, see the main National Translation Award page.

Lucien Stryk Asian Translation Prize

In 2009, ALTA announced a $6,000 translation award named in honor of Lucien Stryk (1924-2013), acclaimed Zen poet and translator of Japanese and Chinese Zen poetry. The Lucien Stryk Prize is awarded annually to the translator of a book-length translation of Asian poetry, or source texts from Zen Buddhism. Eligible translations may be from Chinese, Hindi, Japanese, Kannada, Korean, Sanskrit, Tamil, Thai, or Vietnamese into English. The Lucien Stryk Prize is intended for translations of contemporary works, but retranslations or first-time translations of older works may also be considered. The inaugural Lucien Stryk Prize was awarded in 2010. The winner is announced each year at the ALTA Annual Conference.

Recent winners
2020: Jake Levine, Soeun Seo, and Hedgie Choi for Hysteria by Kim Yideum, translated from the Korean
2019: Don Mee Choi for Autobiography of Death by Kim Hyesoon, translated from the Korean
2018: Bonnie Huie for Notes of a Crocodile by Qiu Miaojin, translated from the Chinese
 2017: Jennifer Feeley for Not Written Words by Xi Xi, translated from the Chinese
 2016: Sawako Nakayasu for The Collected Poems of Chika Sagawa by Chika Sagawa, translated from the Japanese
 2015: Eleanor Goodman for Something Crosses My Mind by Wang Xiaoni, translated from the Chinese
 2014: Jonathan Chaves for Every Rock a Universe: The Yellow Mountains and Chinese Travel Writing including A Record of Comprehending the Essentials of the Yellow Mountains by Wang Hongdu, translated from the Chinese
 2013: Lucas Klein for Notes on the Mosquito by Chuan Xi, translated from the Chinese
 2012: Don Mee Choi for All the Garbage of the World, Unite! by Kim Hyesoon, translated from the Korean
 2011: Charles Egan for Clouds Thick, Whereabouts Unknown: Poems by Zen Monks of China, translated from the Chinese
 2010: Red Pine (Bill Porter) for In Such Hard Times: The Poetry of Wei Ying-wu by Wei Ying-wu, translated from the Chinese

Italian Prose in Translation Award (IPTA)

The Italian Prose in Translation Award (IPTA), which was inaugurated in 2015, recognizes the importance of contemporary Italian prose (fiction and literary non-fiction) and promotes the translation of Italian works into English. This $5,000 prize will be awarded annually to a translator of a recent work of Italian prose (fiction or literary non-fiction). The winning translators and books are featured at the annual ALTA conference. Both translators and publishers are invited to submit titles. The winner is announced each year at the ALTA Annual Conference.

Recent winners
 2022: Anna Chiafele and Lisa Pike for Penelope by Silvana La Spina
 2021: Stephen Twilley for Diary of a Foreigner in Paris by Curzio Malaparte
 2020: Frederika Randall for I Am God by Giacomo Sartori
 2019: Simon Carnell and Erica Segre for The Eight Mountains by Paolo Cognetti
 2018: Elizabeth Harris for For Isabel, a Mandala by Antonio Tabucchi
 2017: Matthew Holden for We Want Everything by Nanni Balestrini
 2016: Ann Goldstein for The Story of the Lost Child by Elena Ferrante
 2015: Anne Milano Appel for Blindly by Claudio Magris

The Cliff Becker Book Prize in Translation

The Cliff Becker Book Prize in Translation was given to an unpublished book-length manuscript of poetry in translation and includes a $1,000 prize and publication by White Pine Press. The prize was suspended in 2019, and has reverted to the publisher White Pine Press.

Winners
 2019: Cole Heinowitz for Bleeding From All 5 Senses by Mario Santiago Papasquiaro
 2018: Anne O. Fisher and Derek Mong for The Joyous Science: Selected Poems of Maxim Amelin
 2017: Chloe Hill for Purifications or the Sign of Retaliation by Myriam Fraga

ALTA Travel Fellowships

ALTA Travel Fellowships are awards of $1,000 each that are designed to help early-career translators cover the travel and lodging expenses associated with attending the ALTA Annual Conference. Each year, four to six winners are selected through a competitive application process, and ALTA Fellows give a public reading of their work at the conference. ALTA Fellows are typically first-time ALTA conference attendees and, although they may have a few published translations, they must be relatively early in their translation careers.

Recent winners
 2020: Karen Hung Curtis (Peter K. Jansen Memorial Travel Fellow, Hong Kong Chinese), Dong Li (Peter K. Jansen Memorial Travel Fellow, Mandarin Chinese), Shoshana Akabas (Hebrew), Alex Karsavin (Russian), Jamie Lauer (Spanish), Kristen Renee Miller (French), Laura Nagle (French, Irish & Spanish), Ena Selimović (Bosnian, Croatian & Serbian), Öykü Tekten (Turkish)
 2019: Salazar Monárrez (Peter K. Jansen Memorial Travel Fellow, Spanish & ASL), Maia Evrona (Yiddish), Caroline Grace Froh (German), Anni Liu (Mandarin), Gnaomi Siemens (Old English, Old Scots & Sumerian) 
 2018: Mariam Rahmani (Peter K. Jansen Memorial Travel Fellow, Persian), Elina Alter (Russian and German), Lizzie Buehler (Korean), Aaron Robertson (Italian), Brian Sneeden (Greek), Maggie Zebracka (Polish)
 2017: Aaron Coleman (Peter K. Jansen Memorial Travel Fellow, Spanish), Bonnie Chau (Chinese and French), Ellen Jones (Spanish), Zoë Sandford (Arabic and French), Timea Sipos (Hungarian), David Smith (Norwegian)
 2016: Bruna Dantas Lobato (Peter K. Jansen Memorial Travel Fellow, Brazilian Portuguese), Monika Cassel (German), Nicholas Glastonbury (Turkish), Haider Shahbaz (Urdu), and Kelsi Vanada (Spanish)
 2015: Claire Eder (French), Anne Greeott (Italian & Spanish), Audrey Hall (Spanish), Christiana Hills (French), and Canaan Morse (Chinese)
 2014: Megan Berkobien (Catalan), Tenzin Dickie (Tibetan), Alice Guthrie (Arabic), Sara Nović (Croatian), Christopher Tamigi (Italian), and Annie Tucker (Bahasa Indonesia)
 2013: Andrew Barrett, Meghan Flaherty, Adam Z. Levy, Matthew Lundin, and Emma Ramadan
 2012: Alexandra Berlina, Joshua Daniel Edwin, Janet Ha, Hai-Dang Phan, and Claire Van Winkle
 2011: Nora Delaney, Tara FitzGerald, Yardenne Greenspan, and Nikki Settelmeyer
 2010: Dustin Lovett, Lucas Millheim, Juliana Nalerio, Thomas Pruiksma, and Yoshihisa Tomonaga
 2009: Meg Arenberg, Oksana Jackim, Robin Myers, and Rabbi Jeremy Schwartz
 2008: Peter Bull, Peter Golub, Jordan Pleasant, and Andrea Rosenberg

Publications

Translation Review

Translation Review, founded in 1978, is a twice-yearly print publication that highlights the theoretical, critical, and practical aspects surrounding the study, craft, and teaching of literary translation. Each issue of Translation Review may include interviews with translators, essays on the theory and practice of translation, articles on teaching literary works in translation and/or literary translation practice at colleges and universities, profiles of publishers and reports on emerging trends in the publishing of literary translations, and reviews of translations that focus specifically on translation-related aspects.

ALTA Guides to Literary Translation

The ALTA Guides to Literary Translation are brochures offering practical information, professional advice, and useful resources for literary translators at various points in their careers. As of 2014, there are five ALTA Guides to Literary Translation, each available as a PDF downloadable from the (archived) ALTA website:

 The Making of a Literary Translator introduces new and unpublished translators to the basics of translation and provides tips for developing translation skills.
 Breaking into Print guides translators through the process of selecting a text and an appropriate publication venue and discusses obstacles particular to publishing literary translations.
 The Proposal for a Book-Length Translation is an aid for navigating the proposal process, from initial query through to publication, with special information about how to research and/or obtain English-language publication rights.
 Promoting Your Literary Translation offers tools for promoting and marketing a published translation.
 The Literary Translator and the Internet is a basic guide to help literary translators make the most of the various modes and resources of the internet to in order to share and promote their craft.

ALTA Newsletter

ALTA monthly e-newsletter provides information about upcoming conferences, grants, prizes, calls for papers, member news, and other items of interest.

See also
 International Federation of Translators
 National Translation Award
 Lucien Stryk Asian Translation Prize

References

External links
 ALTA Homepage

Translation associations of the United States
Literary translators